These are the Records for the Chinese Football League since its inception in 1994.

Scorers

All-time top scorers
The following is a cumulative record of all time goals scored by single players in Chinese Top Level Professional League, since its inception in 1994 as the Chinese Jia-A League. Players with at least 50 goals are listed.

Top scoring foreign players

Appearances

All-time top appearances
The following table lists players who have played the most games within the top tier of Chinese football. Zou Yougen is the  first player to make 300 or more appearances within the Jia-A or CSL League.

Top Appearance foreigner players
This section listed the foreign players who had most appearances in Chinese Top Level professional football leagues

International performances by players

Scorer record in International club competition

Apperarence record in International club competition

Manager

Most matches in Charge

League winning manager 
this table listed manager of Chinese top level professional league Champions

All-time League Table 

The All-Time League Table is a cumulative record of all match results, points and goals of every team that has played in the League since its inception in 1994. The table that follows is accurate as of the end of the Chinese Super League 2009 season. Teams in bold are part of the Chinese Super League 2010. Numbers in bold are the record (highest) numbers in each column.

League attendance 
The attendance figures are announced by the league department of CFA. 1994–2001 Jia-A figures was corrected by Titan Sports., also on Blog.Sina.Com, the figures after 2002 was calculated from the record of the Official CFA site

Awards 

China used to have three main award series, they are:

Mr. China Football Award, started from 1994, voted by fans all over the country, to award the player of the year.

Three Golden Awards, organized by China Sports Daily, started from 1983, to award the best performance players in all kinds of tournament, not only in the leagues, the awards includes:
Player of the year – Golden Ball awards
Best Scorer of the year – Golden Boot awards
Referee of the year – Golden Whistle awards

Official CFA League awards, Is the Official League awards, Awarded by CFA, includes:
Most Valuable players of the league awards (MVP) 
League Top Scorer awards
Manager of the year awards
Referee of the year awards
in 1999 season, three other items added as regular awards
Youth Player of the year awards (MYP)
Club of the year awards
Fair play club of the year awards
The league oscar also involve some occasional awards

In the year 2002, the three series above was merged into the Official CFA Annual Awards.  It now includes:
Mr. Football League Golden Ball awards, also called MVP awards or Mr. China Football awards by some media
Best Scorer Golden Boot awards
Ref'e'ree of the year Golden Whistle awards
Manager of the year awards
Youth player of the year awards

Best player awards

Most Valuable Player of the League 
Most Valuable players of the league awards; from the 2002 edition onwards, named Mr. Football League Golden Ball awards

Mr. China Football 
First awarded in the year 1994.  It merged with the "Most Valuable Player of the League" award of the Official CFA Annual awards in 2002.

Golden Ball Awards 
It first awarded in the year 1983, and in the year 2002, merged with the "Most Valuable Player of the League" award of the Official CFA Annual awards

Top Scorer of the League 
It first awarded in the year 1980

Manager of the year 
The award does not necessarily go to the manager of the champions.

Youth player of the year

Team of the year 

The Team of the Year is awarded by the Chinese Football Association, It first awarded in 1995, no award in 1998 & 2000,  Voted by fans all-over China.

Other Records 
As of October 20, 2012

Individual Player
for top scorers, see statistics above
Most goals is a single season:29 goals
 Eran Zahavi for Guangzhou R&F (2019)
Most goals in a game : 4 goals
 Hu Zhijun for Guangzhou Apollo vs Shanghai Shenhua (14 August 1994)
 Hao Haidong for Dalian Wanda vs Guangdong Hongyuan (10 December 1997)
 Zou Jie for Dalian Shide vs August 1 (8 July 2001)
 Li Bing for Sichuan Dahe vs Liaoning Bird (14 April 2002)
 Kwame Ayew for Shaanxi Baorong vs Dalian Shide (21 October 2004)
 Li Jinyu for Shandong Luneng vs Liaoning FC (21 May 2006)
 Elvis Scott for Changchun Yatai vs Shanghai Shenhua (27 May 2007)
 Éber Luís Cucchi for Tianjin Teda vs Dalian Shide (30 November 2008)
 Peter Utaka for Dalian Aerbin vs Hangzhou Greentown (30 June 2013)
 Eran Zahavi for Guangzhou R&F vs Yanbian Funde (23 July 2017)
Most career hat-tricks : 6 times
 Hao Haidong
Fastest hat-trick : 10 minutes
 Li Jinyu for Shandong Luneng vs Liaoning FC (21 May 2006)
Youngest player : 15 years 9 months and 26 days
 Ma Yiming for Shanghai Zobon vs Sichuan FC (22 May 2005)
Youngest goalscorer : 16 years 9 months and 26 days
 Huang Bowen for Beijing Guoan vs Shenyang Ginde (26 May 2004)
Fastest goal : 7 seconds
 Ji Xiang for Jiangsu Sainty vs Guangzhou Evergrande (20 October 2012)
Most consecutive clean-sheets: 675 minutes
 Sun Gang for Shenzhen Ping'an (started on June 17, 2001, 0–2 v Liaoning Hongyun, 77' of the match; ended on October 28, 2001, 0–3 v Dalian Shide, 31' of the match)

Club
Most League championships : 8 times
Dalian Shide (1994, 1996, 1997, 1998, 2000, 2001, 2002, 2005)
Longest uninterrupted spell in Top Division: 15 years (1993–present)
Beijing Guoan
Shandong Luneng
Shanghai Shenhua
Most goals scored in a season : 78 goals
Guangzhou Evergrande (2013)
Fewest goals scored in a season : 10 goals
Guangzhou Songri (1996)
Most goals conceded in a season : 69 goals
Changsha Ginde (2001)
Fewest goals conceded in a season : 13 goals
Shandong Luneng (1999)
Biggest goal difference in a season : 60 goals
Guangzhou Evergrande (2013)
Most points in a season : 77 points
Guangzhou Evergrande (2013)
Fewest points in a season : 7 points
Shenyang Ginde (2001)
Longest unbeaten streak : 55 matches
Dalian Shide (1995–1997) (started on September 03 1995, 1–0 v Guangzhou Apollo; ended on December 21, 1998, 2–4 v Shanghai Shenhua)
Most wins in a season : 24 wins
Guangzhou Evergrande (2013)
Fewest wins in a season : 1 wins
Changsha Ginde (1994)
Jiangsu Shuntian (1994)
Most draws in a season : 14 draws
Shaanxi Baorong (2007)
Most losses in a season : 23 losses
Changsha Ginde (2001)
Fewest losses in a season : 0 losses
Dalian Shide (1996)
Most goals in a game  : 10 goals
Beijing Guoan 9–1 Shanghai Shenhua (20 July 1997)
Record win : 9–1, 8–0
Beijing Guoan 9–1 Shanghai Shenhua (20 July 1997)
Dalian Shide 8–0 Bayi Football Team (8 July 2001)
Shanghai SIPG 8–0 Dalian Yifang (3 March 2018)
Highest scoring draw: 4–4
Sichuan FC 4–4 Shandong Luneng (26 November 2003)
Liaoning Hongyun 4–4 Shanghai Shenhua (12 November 2008)

Appearances

All-time top appearances
The following table lists players who have played the most games within the top tier of Chinese football. Zou Yougen is the  first player to make 300 or more appearances within the Jia-A or CSL League.

Top Appearance foreigner players
This section listed the foreign players who had most appearances in Chinese Top Level professional football leagues

International performances by players

Scorer record in International club competition

Apperarence record in International club competition

Manager

Most matches in Charge

League winning manager 
this table listed manager of Chinese top level professional league Champions

All-time League Table 

The All-Time League Table is a cumulative record of all match results, points and goals of every team that has played in the League since its inception in 1994. The table that follows is accurate as of the end of the Chinese Super League 2009 season. Teams in bold are part of the Chinese Super League 2010. Numbers in bold are the record (highest) numbers in each column.

League attendance 
The attendance figures are announced by the league department of CFA. 1994–2001 Jia-A figures was corrected by Titan Sports., also on Blog.Sina.Com, the figures after 2002 was calculated from the record of the Official CFA site

Awards 

China used to have three main award series, they are:

Mr. China Football Award, started from 1994, voted by fans all over the country, to award the player of the year.

Three Golden Awards, organized by China Sports Daily, started from 1983, award the best performance players in all kinds of tournament, not only in the leagues, the awards includes:
Player of the year – Golden Ball awards
Best Scorer of the year – Golden Boot awards
Referee of the year – Golden Whistle awards

Official CFA League awards, Is the Official League awards, Awarded by CFA, includes:
Most Valuable players of the league awards (MVP) 
League Top Scorer awards
Manager of the year awards
Referee of the year awards
in 1999 season, three other items added as regular awards
Youth Player of the year awards (MYP)
Club of the year awards
Fair play club of the year awards
The league oscar also involve some occasional awards

In the year 2002, the three series above was merged into the Official CFA Annual Awards.  It now includes:
Mr. Football League Golden Ball awards, also called MVP awards or Mr. China Football awards by some media
Best Scorer Golden Boot awards
Ref'e'ree of the year Golden Whistle awards
Manager of the year awards
Youth player of the year awards

Best player awards

Most Valuable Player of the League 
Most Valuable players of the league awards; from the 2002 edition onwards, named Mr. Football League Golden Ball awards

Mr. China Football 
First awarded in the year 1994.  It merged with the "Most Valuable Player of the League" award of the Official CFA Annual awards in 2002.

Golden Ball Awards 
It first awarded in the year 1983, and in the year 2002, merged with the "Most Valuable Player of the League" award of the Official CFA Annual awards

Top Scorer of the League 
It first awarded in the year 1980

Manager of the year 
The award does not necessarily go to the manager of the champions.

Youth player of the year

Team of the year 

The Team of the Year is awarded by the Chinese Football Association, It first awarded in 1995, no award in 1998 & 2000,  Voted by fans all-over China.

Other records 
As of October 20, 2012

Individual Player
for top scorers, see statistics above
Most goals in a game : 4 goals
 Hu Zhijun for Guangzhou Apollo vs Shanghai Shenhua (14 August 1994)
 Hao Haidong for Dalian Wanda vs Guangdong Hongyuan (10 December 1997)
 Zou Jie for Dalian Shide vs August 1 (8 July 2001)
 Li Bing for Sichuan Dahe vs Liaoning Bird (14 April 2002)
 Kwame Ayew for Shaanxi Baorong vs Dalian Shide (21 October 2004)
 Li Jinyu for Shandong Luneng vs Liaoning FC (21 May 2006)
 Elvis Scott for Changchun Yatai vs Shanghai Shenhua (27 May 2007)
 Éber Luís Cucchi for Tianjin Teda vs Dalian Shide (30 November 2008)
 Peter Utaka for Dalian Aerbin vs Hangzhou Greentown (30 June 2013)
 Eran Zahavi for Guangzhou R&F vs Yanbian Funde (23 July 2017)
Most career hat-tricks : 6 times
 Hao Haidong
Fastest hat-trick : 10 minutes
 Li Jinyu for Shandong Luneng vs Liaoning FC (21 May 2006)
Youngest player : 15 years 9 months and 26 days
 Ma Yiming for Shanghai Zobon vs Sichuan FC (22 May 2005)
Youngest goalscorer : 16 years 9 months and 26 days
 Huang Bowen for Beijing Guoan vs Shenyang Ginde (26 May 2004)
Fastest goal : 7 seconds
 Ji Xiang for Jiangsu Sainty vs Guangzhou Evergrande (20 October 2012)
Most consecutive clean-sheets: 675 minutes
 Sun Gang for Shenzhen Ping'an (started on June 17, 2001, 0–2 v Liaoning Hongyun, 77' of the match; ended on October 28, 2001, 0–3 v Dalian Shide, 31' of the match)

Club
Most League championships : 8 times
Dalian Shide (1994, 1996, 1997, 1998, 2000, 2001, 2002, 2005)
Longest uninterrupted spell in Top Division: 15 years (1993–present)
Beijing Guoan
Shandong Luneng
Shanghai Shenhua
Most goals scored in a season : 78 goals
Guangzhou Evergrande (2013)
Fewest goals scored in a season : 10 goals
Guangzhou Songri (1996)
Most goals conceded in a season : 69 goals
Changsha Ginde (2001)
Fewest goals conceded in a season : 13 goals
Shandong Luneng (1999)
Biggest goal difference in a season : 60 goals
Guangzhou Evergrande (2013)
Most points in a season : 77 points
Guangzhou Evergrande (2013)
Fewest points in a season : 7 points
Shenyang Ginde (2001)
Longest unbeaten streak : 55 matches
Dalian Shide (1995–1997) (started on September 03 1995, 1–0 v Guangzhou Apollo; ended on December 21, 1998, 2–4 v Shanghai Shenhua)
Most wins in a season : 24 wins
Guangzhou Evergrande (2013)
Fewest wins in a season : 1 wins
Changsha Ginde (1994)
Jiangsu Shuntian (1994)
Most draws in a season : 14 draws
Shaanxi Baorong (2007)
Most losses in a season : 23 losses
Changsha Ginde (2001)
Fewest losses in a season : 0 losses
Dalian Shide (1996)
Most goals in a game  : 10 goals
Beijing Guoan 9–1 Shanghai Shenhua (20 July 1997)
Record win : 9–1, 8–0
Beijing Guoan 9–1 Shanghai Shenhua (20 July 1997)
Dalian Shide 8–0 Bayi Football Team (8 July 2001)
Shanghai SIPG 8–0 Dalian Yifang (3 March 2018)
Highest scoring draw: 4–4
Sichuan FC 4–4 Shandong Luneng (26 November 2003)
Liaoning Hongyun 4–4 Shanghai Shenhua (12 November 2008)

References

External links 
 Chinese Football History Statistics
 Chinese Super League Statistics by Zuqiu614 
 Official site of the Chinese Football Association 
 China League and Cup History on RSSSF 
 China League and Cup History 

Chinese Super League records and statistics
Football in China
China
All-time football league tables
Records